Jai Desmond Taurima (born 26 June 1972 in Southport, Queensland) is an Australian retired athlete who competed in the long jump.

Despite smoking a packet of cigarettes a day, he won a surprising silver medal at the 2000 Olympics with a personal best jump of 8.49 metres. This was the Oceanic record.
Son of Elaine (deceased) and Floyd Taurima, siblings Corrie, and Australian track and field coach Stacey Taurima. His partner is Jennifer Smith. He is also known as 'Jumping Jai' or 'Jumping Jai Taurima'.

In addition, Taurima won a silver medal at the 1998 Commonwealth Games.

Since retiring from athletics, Taurima has joined the Australian Federal Police.

Of New Zealand Māori descent, Taurima affiliates to the Ngāti Kahungunu iwi.

In 2014, his daughter, Indie Rose, died from leukemia at the age of two years old.

References

External links

1972 births
Living people
Australian male long jumpers
Athletes (track and field) at the 1994 Commonwealth Games
Athletes (track and field) at the 1998 Commonwealth Games
Athletes (track and field) at the 2000 Summer Olympics
Olympic athletes of Australia
Australian people of Māori descent
New Zealand Māori sportspeople
Australian Institute of Sport track and field athletes
Sportspeople from the Gold Coast, Queensland
Ngāti Kahungunu people
Medalists at the 2000 Summer Olympics
Olympic silver medalists for Australia
Olympic silver medalists in athletics (track and field)
Commonwealth Games medallists in athletics
Commonwealth Games silver medallists for Australia
Medallists at the 1998 Commonwealth Games